The 2017 UCI World Tour was a competition that included thirty-seven road cycling events throughout the 2017 men's cycling season. It was the ninth edition of the ranking system launched by the Union Cycliste Internationale (UCI) in 2009. The competition started with the opening stage of the Tour Down Under on 17 January and concluded with the final stage of the Tour of Guangxi on 24 October. Slovakia's Peter Sagan was the defending champion. The 2017 edition featured ten new events.

Sagan was unable to defend his World Tour title, winning just one race overall at the Grand Prix Cycliste de Québec in September, as he finished fourth in the points rankings; he finished one point behind third-placed Tom Dumoulin. Van Avermaet led the standings for the majority of the season, winning four races overall; three on home soil at Omloop Het Nieuwsblad, E3 Harelbeke, and Gent–Wevelgem, with a single win in France at Paris–Roubaix. Froome won two of the three Grand Tours to be held in 2017, winning his fourth Tour de France, before taking a first Vuelta a España success, the first Tour–Vuelta double in 39 years. The success gave him the World Tour points lead for several hours before Van Avermaet surpassed him with a seventh-place finish at the Grand Prix Cycliste de Montréal.

With 10,961 points,  finished in third place primarily down to Van Avermaet's performances, with further wins to Richie Porte (Tour Down Under and Tour de Romandie) and Dylan Teuns at the Tour de Pologne.

Teams

Events
All events from the 2016 UCI World Tour were included, although some events were scheduled on different dates than previous editions. Ten new events were also added to the calendar. An eleventh event, the Tour of Qatar, was originally added to the calendar in October 2016, but it was cancelled in December 2016 due to lack of sponsorship support. Another new-for-2017 World Tour event, the Presidential Tour of Turkey, was postponed from its initial dates of 18–23 April, in February. In March, following a meeting of the UCI Professional Cycling Council, the race was rescheduled for 10–15 October.

A new points ranking was also introduced for the 2017 season, based upon the points scales for the UCI World Ranking. Therefore, up to 60 riders – up from a maximum of 20 riders at the Grand Tours – would be able to score points in all races. As well as the new points rankings, the previous ranking by nations was also removed.

Just as in 2016, the team time trial at the UCI World Championships, scheduled to be held on 17 September, had been due to award points towards the team rankings. In August 2017, the Association International des Groupes Cyclistes Professionels (AIGCP) agreed a deal with the UCI to avoid a boycott of the race, but no points would be awarded towards the World Tour rankings.

Final points standings

Individual

Riders tied with the same number of points were classified by number of victories, then number of second places, third places, and so on, in World Tour events and stages.

 436 riders scored points. 200 other riders finished in positions that would have earned them points, but they were ineligible as members of non-UCI WorldTeams.

Team
Team rankings were calculated by adding the ranking points of all the riders of a team in the table.

Leader progress

Notes

References

External links

 
2017
2017 in men's road cycling